Love Is War may refer to:

 Love Is War (album), a 2006 album by Vanilla Ninja
 Love Is War (1970 film), a 1970 Norwegian film
 Love Is War (2019 film), a Nigerian film
 "Love Is War", a 2010 song by Joe McElderry from Wide Awake
 "Love Is War", a 2013 song by American Young
 Kaguya-sama: Love Is War, a Japanese manga and anime series

See also 
 In Love and War (disambiguation)
 Love and War (disambiguation)
 War is peace